Mario Gosselin (born October 20, 1971) is a Canadian-American professional stock car racing driver, crew chief, and team owner. He owns DGM Racing, a team that competes in the NASCAR Xfinity Series. In 2004, he became the second native of the Province of Quebec to start in a NASCAR Nextel Cup Series race after Superbike legend Yvon Duhamel. In 1997, he became the first Canadian to win the championship title for the NASCAR  CARS Pro Cup Series.

Racing career

Gosselin is a multiple-time winner in the ARCA Racing Series and two-time CARS Pro Cup Series champion. He began his racing career in 1990 at Hialeah, Florida by winning the pure stock division championship.

He moved into late models the next year and has multiple championships and many wins to his credit at various speedways. In 1998, Gosselin made his NASCAR debut, at Myrtle Beach Speedway, in his No. 71 Chevrolet, finishing sixteenth. He also qualified on the pole and won his first ARCA RE/MAX Series start, in 1999. That first ARCA victory came at the Lowe's Motor Speedway in Charlotte, N.C. He has since competed in several part-time ARCA schedules and has won another two races.

In 2004, Gosselin ran two races late in the Nextel Cup Series season in the No. 80 Hover Motorsports Ford, finishing 41st in both starts. He rejoined NASCAR competition in 2008 as the driver and crew chief of the No. 12 Crashedtoys.com Chevrolet Silverado, which was owned by his wife Michelle, in the Craftsman Truck Series. He and Scotty Crockett shared the driving duties of the truck and made six starts with the team. After the season, attorney James Carter became a sponsor and co-owner of the team, allowing Gosselin and his wife to open a second truck team. Gosselin made fifteen starts in 2009 and finished six of them. His best finish and first ever NASCAR top-10 came at Talladega Superspeedway in the fall where he ended up sixth in a wild race. Starting at Talladega, Gosselin picked up a sponsorship from TireMonkey.com. With a sponsorship in place, he ran the full 2010 season, but was forced to sell his owners' points to Johanna Long and her Panhandle Motorsports team for 2011. Gosselin took a new role as a crew chief for Truck Series driver Russ Dugger.

Gosselin returned to the Busch Series, now the Xfinity Series, in 2015, racing the No. 90 King Autosport Chevy at Daytona International Speedway. He continued racing sporadically until 2017, with his team later being renamed DGM Racing. In December 2020, Gosselin announced he would once again race in the series with DGM, driving the No. 91 in the 2021 season opener at Daytona.

Personal life
Gosselin is a native of Sainte-Marie, Quebec. He lived there before moving with his family to Florida in 1981. He settled in Lake Wales, Florida a few years ago.

Motorsports career results

NASCAR
(key) (Bold – Pole position awarded by qualifying time. Italics – Pole position earned by points standings or practice time. * – Most laps led.)

Nextel Cup Series

Xfinity Series

Camping World Truck Series

 Season still in progress
 Ineligible for series points

ARCA Racing Series
(key) (Bold – Pole position awarded by qualifying time. Italics – Pole position earned by points standings or practice time. * – Most laps led.)

See also
 List of Canadians in NASCAR

References

External links
 
 
 
 

1971 births
ARCA Menards Series drivers
Racing drivers from Quebec
Living people
NASCAR drivers
NASCAR team owners
People from Lake Wales, Florida
People from Sainte-Marie, Quebec
CARS Tour drivers
Racing drivers from Florida
Sportspeople from Polk County, Florida